Railroad Terminal Historic District is a national historic district in Binghamton in Broome County, New York. The district includes 19 contributing buildings.  Four of the buildings were directly related to Binghamton's rail passenger and freight operations, including the passenger station. Five buildings were built as warehouses, and ten were built to house retail activities with residential or office uses on the upper floors. The buildings were built between 1876 and 1910, with a major addition to one of them completed in 1932. This Delaware, Lackawanna and Western Railroad passenger station, with its Italian Renaissance campanile, was built in 1901. For most years of passenger service to Binghamton,  Delaware and Hudson Railway and Erie Railroad trains used a different station 150 yards away.

It was listed on the National Register of Historic Places in 1986.

Destinations when the station was in use

From this location there were Lackawanna trains such as the Phoebe Snow and the overnight Owl to Buffalo, New York to the west and Hoboken to the east. The Interstate Express served Syracuse to the north and Allentown and Philadelphia to the south. Other Lackawanna trains also served Syracuse and Utica, New York to the north and Scranton, the Poconos and northern New Jersey to the south.

Erie Railroad trains joined the DL&W trains at the station in 1958. Trains such as the Lake Cities, the Erie Limited and the Atlantic Express/Pacific Express served Chicago to the west and Hoboken to the east. (Erie trains that year also stopped using the company's Pavonia Terminal in Jersey City.) The last long distance train was on January 6, 1970 when the Lake Cities stopped running.

References

External links

Buildings and structures in Binghamton, New York
Railway stations on the National Register of Historic Places in New York (state)
Historic districts on the National Register of Historic Places in New York (state)
Former railway stations in New York (state)
Binghamton, New York
Historic American Buildings Survey in New York (state)
Historic American Engineering Record in New York (state)
Historic districts in Broome County, New York
National Register of Historic Places in Broome County, New York